Ixiolaena is a genus of flowering plants in the daisy family.

Species
There is only one known species, Ixiolaena viscosa, native to Australia. Several other species were formerly considered members of this genus, but are now judged more suitable to Leiocarpa.

References

Endemic flora of Australia
Gnaphalieae
Monotypic Asteraceae genera